Heiner Lauterbach (born 10 April 1953) is a German actor.

Life and work 

Heiner Lauterbach was married to German actress Katja Flint who is the mother of his son Oscar (*1988). Later he had a relationship with Jenny Elvers. Since 7 September 2001 he has been married to Viktoria Skaf. They have two children: Maya (*2002) and Vito (*2007). Heiner Lauterbach is the dubbed German voice for several American actors. Among others, he has dubbed Richard Gere, Jack Nicholson and Christopher Reeve.

Early life
Lauterbach attended a Waldorf school, from which he graduated with a general certificate (Mittlere Reife).

Awards 
1986 Deutscher Filmpreis
1996 Bayerischer Filmpreis (Bavarian Film Awards), Best Actor 
1997 Bambi
1998 Darstellerpreis der Deutschen Akademie der Künste
1998 Bayerischer Fernsehpreis

Filmography

Film

Television

References

External links 
 
 

1953 births
Living people
Actors from Cologne
German male film actors
German male television actors
German male voice actors
20th-century German male actors
21st-century German male actors
German autobiographers
German male non-fiction writers
German Film Award winners
Waldorf school alumni